Ivano-Frankivsk Oblast local election, 2006 is a local election in Ivano-Frankivsk Oblast that took place on March 26, 2006. Seats were split among five political parties and blocks, which received at least 3% popular vote.

Overview
The elections were largely won by Our Ukraine Bloc with the greatest majority of 57% in the Yaremche municipality. The lowest popularity of the political bloc was in the biggest cities in the region Ivano-Frankivsk and Kolomyia and if the city of Ivano-Frankivsk Our Ukraine marginally has won, the Kolomyia municipality was decisively "overtaken" by the Yulia Tymoshenko Bloc.

The greatest support for the region's third party Ukrainian National Bloc was shown in the western corner of Ivano-Frankivsk Oblast where in the Bolekhiv municipality and the Dolyna Raion the party managed to make over 10% mark. Also, remarkable performance of the Revival of Prykarapattya that even though barely made it to the regional council it had a substantial support in the Verkhovyna Raion where it, however, became the third party. Revival of Prykarpattya also became third in the Kolomyia municipality and the Kolomyia Raion.

Results 

Presidium of the Council
 Chairman: Ihor Oliynyk (Our Ukraine Bloc - Rukh)
 First Deputy Chairman: Zinoviy Berehovsky (Our Ukraine Bloc - Our Ukraine)
 Deputy Chairman: Ostap Dzesa (Our Ukraine Bloc - PPPU)
 Director of Council's secretariat: Vasyl Losyuk

Electoral maps

Ivano-Frankivsk city council

Mayor
Viktor Anushkevychus (Ukrainian National Bloc - Ukrainian People's Party)

References

External links 
 Official website Ivano-Frankivsk Oblast Council
 Monitoring the electoral process in Ivano-Frankivsk region

Local elections in Ukraine
2006 elections in Ukraine
History of Ivano-Frankivsk Oblast
March 2006 events in Europe